Chappo is the debut solo album of singer Roger Chapman, released in 1979.

Track listing

Side one

Side two

Personnel
 Roger Chapman – Harmonica, Vocals
 Dave Markee – Bass
 Brian Odgers – Bass
 Billy Livsey – Keyboards
 Geoff Whitehorn – Guitar
 Micky Moody – Guitar
 Henry Spinetti – Drums
 Simon Morton – Percussion
 Ray Cooper – Percussion
 Ron Aspery – Saxophone
 Poli Palmer – Synthesizer
 Peter Hope-Evans – Harmonica
 Joy Yates – Backing Vocals
 Vicki Brown – Backing Vocals
 Jimmy Chambers – Backing Vocals
 George Chandler – Backing Vocals
Technical
David Tickle, Steve Churchyard – engineer
Cameron McVey – photography

Releases
 CD	Chappo Polydor	 1990
 CD	Chappo Essential Records / Castle Music Ltd.	 1999

References

External links 
 
 

1979 debut albums
Arista Records albums
Roger Chapman albums